Moorefield Township is one of the ten townships of Clark County, Ohio, United States. The population as of the 2010 census was 12,436.

Geography
Located in the northern part of the county, it borders the following townships:
Urbana Township, Champaign County - north
Union Township, Champaign County - northeast
Pleasant Township - east
Harmony Township - southeast
Springfield Township - south
German Township - west
Mad River Township, Champaign County - northwest corner

Part of the city of Springfield, the county seat of Clark County, is located in southwestern Moorefield Township, and the census-designated place of Northridge is located in the township's west.

Name and history
Moorefield Township was organized in 1818.  It was named after Moorefield, West Virginia (then a city in Virginia), the former hometown of many of its first settlers.

Statewide, the only other Moorefield Township is located in Harrison County.

Government
The township is governed by a three-member board of trustees, who are elected in November of odd-numbered years to a four-year term beginning on the following January 1. Two are elected in the year after the presidential election and one is elected in the year before it. There is also an elected township fiscal officer, who serves a four-year term beginning on April 1 of the year after the election, which is held in November of the year before the presidential election. Vacancies in the fiscal officership or on the board of trustees are filled by the remaining trustees.

Schools
Moorefield Township is home to Kenton Ridge High School, Northeastern High School, Northridge Middle School, South Vienna Middle School, Rolling Hills Elementary School, Northridge Elementary School, and South Vienna Middle School.  All of these are part of the Northeastern Local School District.

References

External links
Township website
County website

Townships in Clark County, Ohio
Townships in Ohio
1818 establishments in Ohio
Populated places established in 1818